Samuel Cole may refer to:

 Samuel Cole (settler) (c. 1597–1666/67), early settler of Boston, Massachusetts
 Samuel Cole (politician) (1856–1935), American politician in Massachusetts
 Samuel Cole (footballer) (1874–?), English footballer